Strep may refer to:

 Streptococcus, a genus of bacteria
 Streptococcal pharyngitis, an infectious disease
 Streptocarpus, a genus of flowering plants
 Streptomycin, an antibiotic
 Specific Targeted Research Project (STReP), a type of medium-sized research project funded by the European Commission